Hemicordulia okinawensis is a species of dragonfly in the family Corduliidae. It is endemic to Japan.

References

Insects of Japan
Corduliidae
Insects described in 1947
Taxonomy articles created by Polbot